Lathrobium is a genus of rove beetles.

Species
 Lathrobium alesi Assing, 2010
 Lathrobium alishanum Assing, 2010
 Lathrobium bisinuatum Assing & Peng in Assing, Peng & Zhao, 2013
 Lathrobium conexum Assing & Peng in Assing, Peng & Zhao, 2013
 Lathrobium coniunctum Assing & Peng in Assing, Peng & Zhao, 2013
 Lathrobium ensigerum Assing & Peng in Assing, Peng & Zhao, 2013
 Lathrobium extraculum Assing, 2010
 Lathrobium follitum Assing, 2010
 Lathrobium guizhouensis Chen, Li & Zhao, 2005
 Lathrobium hastatum Assing & Peng in Assing, Peng & Zhao, 2013
 Lathrobium houhuanicum Assing, 2010
 Lathrobium involutum Assing, 2010
 Lathrobium iunctum Assing & Peng in Assing, Peng & Zhao, 2013
 Lathrobium lingae Peng, Li & Zhao, 2012
 Lathrobium longwangshanense Peng, Li & Zhao, 2012
 Lathrobium nenkaoicum Assing, 2010
 Lathrobium tarokoense Assing, 2010
 Lathrobium uncum Peng, Li & Zhao, 2012
 Lathrobium utriculatum Assing, 2010

References

Staphylinidae genera
Paederinae